The Emerson School District is a comprehensive community public school district that serves students in pre-kindergarten through twelfth grade from Emerson, in Bergen County, New Jersey, United States.

As of the 2018–19 school year, the district, comprising three schools, had an enrollment of 1,139 students and 98.8 classroom teachers (on an FTE basis), for a student–teacher ratio of 11.5:1.

The district is classified by the New Jersey Department of Education as being in District Factor Group "GH", the third-highest of eight groupings. District Factor Groups organize districts statewide to allow comparison by common socioeconomic characteristics of the local districts. From lowest socioeconomic status to highest, the categories are A, B, CD, DE, FG, GH, I and J.

Schools 
Schools in the district (with 2018–19 enrollment data from the National Center for Education Statistics) are:

Elementary schools
Memorial Elementary School with 302 students in PreK-2
Kristin Gagliano, Principal
Patrick M. Villano Elementary School with 316 students in grades 3-6
Jessica Espinoza, Principal
High school
Emerson Jr./Sr. High School with 496 students in grades 7-12
Brian Hutchinson, Principal

Administration
Core members of the district's administration are:
Brian P. Gatens, Superintendent
Dr. Philip H. Nisonoff, Business Administrator / Board Secretary

Board of education
The district's board of education, with five members, sets policy and oversees the fiscal and educational operation of the district through its administration. As a Type II school district, the board's trustees are elected directly by voters to serve three-year terms of office on a staggered basis, with either one or two seats up for election each year held (since 2015) as part of the November general election. The board appoints a superintendent to oversee the day-to-day operation of the district.

References

External links 
Emerson Public Schools

School Data for the Emerson School District, National Center for Education Statistics

Emerson, New Jersey
New Jersey District Factor Group GH
School districts in Bergen County, New Jersey